Deon Strother (born April 12, 1972) is a former American football running back who played one season with the Denver Broncos of the National Football League. He played college football at the University of Southern California and attended Skyline High School in Oakland, California. He was also a member of the Ottawa Rough Riders of the Canadian Football League.

References

External links
Just Sports Stats
College stats

Living people
1972 births
Players of American football from Michigan
American football running backs
Canadian football running backs
African-American players of American football
African-American players of Canadian football
USC Trojans football players
Denver Broncos players
Ottawa Rough Riders players
Sportspeople from Saginaw, Michigan
21st-century African-American sportspeople
20th-century African-American sportspeople